Miklos Gaál (born 1974 in Espoo, Finland) is a Finnish-Hungarian artist and photographer living in Amsterdam and Helsinki.

References

External links 
 MiklosGaal.com
 Miklos Gaál at Galerie WAGNER + PARTNER
 Artfactsnet

Finnish photographers
1974 births
Living people
Finnish people of Hungarian descent